Russ Case (March 19, 1912 – October 10, 1964) was an American trumpeter and bandleader who led jazz and light music orchestras.

Biography

Case was born in Hamburg, Iowa. His professional career began when he was hired at WOC (AM) in Davenport, Iowa to arrange and play trumpet with local bands on broadcasts. He worked with Frankie Trumbauer in Chicago and Paul Whiteman in New York City, then was hired by NBC to arrange for radio and television. He led orchestras which accompanied broadcasts of singers such as Peggy Lee, Eddy Arnold and Julius LaRosa, but became best known for directing ensembles behind Perry Como, including on his hit single "Till the End of Time".

Case lent his name to dozens of light orchestral albums which were released in the 1950s, and arranged for The Jackie Gleason Show in the 1960s. He also served as conductor for cast recordings of musicals such as Finian's Rainbow, The King and I, The Music Man, My Fair Lady, and Oklahoma!. He died, aged 52, in Miami in 1964.

References
Eugene Chadbourne, Russ Case at Allmusic

American jazz trumpeters
American male trumpeters
American jazz bandleaders
American conductors (music)
American male conductors (music)
Musicians from Iowa
1912 births
1964 deaths
20th-century trumpeters
20th-century American male musicians
American male jazz musicians
MGM Records artists